A resurrection plant is any poikilohydric plant that can survive extreme dehydration, even over months or years.

Examples include:
 Anastatica hierochuntica, also known as the Rose of Jericho, a plant species native to deserts of North Africa
 Asteriscus (plant);
 Boea hygrometrica,
 Craterostigma, members of the Linderniaceae/Scrophulariaceae with snapdragon-like flowers
 Haberlea rhodopensis
 Lichen, a symbiosis that can survive in extreme desiccation,
 Mesembryanthemum, the plant can revive within a short period of time after a drought 
 Myrothamnus flabellifolius, a plant species native to Southern Africa
 Pleopeltis polypodioides, also known as resurrection fern
 Ramonda serbica, a species in the family Gesneriaceae
 Selaginella lepidophylla, a plant species native to North America, Central and South America, and sold as a novelty
 Tillandsia
 Xerophyta, a monocotyledonous genus typically occurring on rock outcrops in Southern African grasslands

Certain resurrection plants have long been sold in their dry, "lifeless" form as curiosities.  This custom was noted by many 19th century authors, and continues today.

In December, 2015, resurrection plants were featured in a TED talk given by Professor Jill Farrant
, Molecular and Cell Biology, University of Cape Town, South Africa, who performs targeted genetic modification of crop plants to make them tolerate desiccation by activating genes that are already there but not natively expressed in response to drought.

See also
 Dehydration
 Cryptobiosis
 Anhydrobiosis
 Hygrochasy

References

Plant physiology
Resurrection plants